Mvoung is a department of Ogooué-Ivindo Province in northern-central Gabon. The capital lies at Ovan. It had a population of 4,022 in 2013.

Towns and villages

References

Ogooué-Ivindo Province
Departments of Gabon